The U.S. Pro Women's Clay Court Championships is a tournament for professional female tennis players played on outdoor clay courts. The event is classified as a $100,000 ITF Women's Circuit tournament and has been held in Palm Harbor, Florida, United States, since 2012.

Past finals

Singles

Doubles

External links 
 ITF search
 Website

ITF Women's World Tennis Tour
Clay court tennis tournaments
Recurring sporting events established in 2012
Tennis tournaments in Florida
2012 establishments in Florida
Sports in Pinellas County, Florida